1997 Academy Awards may refer to:

 69th Academy Awards, the Academy Awards ceremony that took place in 1997
 70th Academy Awards, the 1998 ceremony honoring the best in film for 1997